Grumolo delle Abbadesse is a town and comune in the province of Vicenza, Veneto, north-eastern Italy. It is on SP24 provincial road.

The frazione (hamlet) of Vancimuglio is home to Andrea Palladio's Villa Chiericati.

References

External links
(Google Maps)

Cities and towns in Veneto